This article is about the demographics of Djibouti, including population density, ethnicity, education level, health, economic status, religious affiliations and other aspects of the population.

Ethnic groups

Djibouti is a multiethnic country. As of 2018, it has a population of around 884,017 inhabitants. Djibouti's population grew rapidly during the latter half of the 20th century, increasing from about 69,589 in 1955 to around 869,099 by 2015.

the ethnic composition of Djibouti is= 56.2%Somali 24.2% Afar 
15.6% Arabs
(6.675% Djibouti Arabs [indigenous], 4.525% Yemenis, 4.4% Omanis) and 5% others. The Somali clan component is mainly composed of the Issa clan (Dir), followed by the Gadabuursi and the Isaaq.

The remaining 5% of Djibouti's population primarily consists of Ethiopians and Europeans (French, Italian and Swedish). In addition, as of 2,021, 4,000 U.S. Army troops , 1,350 French Army troops, 600 Japanese Army troops, 400 Chinese Army troops, and an unknown number of German Army troops are stationed at various bases throughout Djibouti. Approximately 76% of local residents are urban dwellers; the remainder are pastoralists. 40,000 people from Yemen live in Djibouti, counting for 4.525% of its total population.

Languages

Djibouti is a multilingual nation. The majority of local residents speak Somali (650,000 speakers in Djibouti city and Ali Sabieh) and Afar (300,000 speakers) as a first language. These idioms are the mother tongues of the Somali and Afar ethnic groups, respectively. Both languages belong to the larger Afroasiatic family. There are 2 official languages in Djibouti: Arabic and French.

Arabic is of religious importance. In formal settings, it consists of Modern Standard Arabic. Colloquially, about 59,000 local residents speak the Ta'izzi-Adeni Arabic dialect, also known as Djibouti Arabic. French serves as a statutory national language. It was inherited from the colonial period, and is the primary language of instruction. Around 17,000 Djiboutians speak it as a first language. Immigrant languages include Omani Arabic (38,900 speakers), Amharic (1,400 speakers), Greek (1,000 speakers) and Hindi (600 speakers).

Population

The proportion of children below the age of 15 in 2010 was 35.8%, 60.9% was between 15 and 65 years of age, while 3.3% was 65 years or older.

Projections
The following are UN medium variant projections; numbers are in thousands:
2015	975
2020	1,065
2025	1,166
2030	1,262
2035	1,356
2040	1,447
2045	1,535
2050	1,619

Vital statistics
Registration of vital events in Djibouti is incomplete. The Population Department of the United Nations prepared the following estimates.

Life expectancy

Other demographic statistics
Demographic statistics according to the World Population Review in 2022.

One birth every 26 minutes	
One death every 76 minutes	
One net migrant every 720 minutes	
Net gain of one person every 38 minutes

The following demographic statistics are from the CIA World Factbook.

Population
957,273 (2022 est.)
884,017 (July 2018 est.)
828,324 (July 2015 est.)

Religions
Sunni Muslim 94% (nearly all Djiboutians), other 6% (mainly foreign-born residents - Shia Muslim, Christian, Hindu, Jewish, Baha'i, and atheist)

Age structure

0-14 years: 29.97% (male 138,701/female 137,588)
15-24 years: 20.32% (male 88,399/female 98,955)
25-54 years: 40.73% (male 156,016/female 219,406)
55-64 years: 5.01% (male 19,868/female 26,307)
65 years and over: 3.97% (male 16,245/female 20,319) (2020 est.)

0-14 years: 30.71% (male 136,191 /female 135,263)
15-24 years: 21.01% (male 87,520 /female 98,239)
25-54 years: 39.63% (male 145,427 /female 204,927)
55-64 years: 4.82% (male 18,967 /female 23,639)
65 years and over: 3.83% (male 15,136 /female 18,708) (2018 est.)

Median age
total: 24.9 years. Country comparison to the world: 163rd
male: 23 years
female: 26.4 years (2020 est.)

total: 24.2 years. Country comparison to the world: 165th
male: 22.4 years 
female: 25.7 years (2018 est.)

Total: 22.8 years
Male: 21.1 years
Female: 24.1 years (2014 est.)

Birth rate
22.25 births/1,000 population (2022 est.) Country comparison to the world: 58th
23.3 births/1,000 population (2018 est.) Country comparison to the world: 59th

Death rate
7.12 deaths/1,000 population (2022 est.) Country comparison to the world: 116th
7.5 deaths/1,000 population (2018 est.) Country comparison to the world: 109th

Total fertility rate
2.15 children born/woman (2022 est.) Country comparison to the world: 91st
2.27 children born/woman (2018 est.) Country comparison to the world: 90th

Net migration rate
4.59 migrant(s)/1,000 population (2022 est.) Country comparison to the world: 24th
5.7 migrant(s)/1,000 population (2017 est.) Country comparison to the world: 19th

Population growth rate
1.97% (2022 est.) Country comparison to the world: 42nd
2.13% (2018 est.) Country comparison to the world: 42nd
2.18% (2016 est.)

Contraceptive prevalence rate
19% (2012)

Dependency ratios
total dependency ratio: 56.5 (2015 est.)
youth dependency ratio: 50.1 (2015 est.)
elderly dependency ratio: 6.4 (2015 est.)
potential support ratio: 15.6 (2015 est.)

Urbanization
urban population: 78.4% of total population (2022)
rate of urbanization: 1.56% annual rate of change (2020-25 est.)

urban population: 77.8% of total population (2018)
rate of urbanization: 1.67% annual rate of change (2015-20 est.)

Major cities - population
DJIBOUTI (capital) 562,000 (2018)

Sex ratio
at birth: 1.03 male(s)/female
under 15 years: 1 male(s)/female
15-24 years: 0.89 male(s)/female
25-54 years: 0.71 male(s)/female
55-64 years: 0.85 male(s)/female
65 years and over: 0.82 male(s)/female
total population:  0.86 male(s)/female (2014 est.)

Life expectancy at birth
total population: 65.3 years. Country comparison to the world: 203rd
male: 62.72 years
female: 67.96 years (2022 est.)

total population: 64 years (2018 est.) Country comparison to the world: 191st
male: 61.4 years (2018 est.)
female: 66.6 years (2018 est.)

Total population: 62.4 years
Male: 59.93 years
Female:  64.94 years (2014 est.)

HIV/AIDS
adult prevalence rate: 1.2% (2012 est.)
people living with HIV/AIDS: 7,700 (2012 est.)
deaths: 690 (2012 est.)

Major infectious diseases
degree of risk: high (2020)
food or waterborne diseases: bacterial and protozoal diarrhea, hepatitis A, and typhoid fever
vectorborne diseases: dengue fever

note: on 21 March 2022, the US Centers for Disease Control and Prevention (CDC) issued a Travel Alert for polio in Africa; Djibouti is currently considered a high risk to travelers for circulating vaccine-derived polioviruses (cVDPV); vaccine-derived poliovirus (VDPV) is a strain of the weakened poliovirus that was initially included in oral polio vaccine (OPV) and that has changed over time and behaves more like the wild or naturally occurring virus; this means it can be spread more easily to people who are unvaccinated against polio and who come in contact with the stool or respiratory secretions, such as from a sneeze, of an “infected” person who received oral polio vaccine; the CDC recommends that before any international travel, anyone unvaccinated, incompletely vaccinated, or with an unknown polio vaccination status should complete the routine polio vaccine series; before travel to any high-risk destination, CDC recommends that adults who previously completed the full, routine polio vaccine series receive a single, lifetime booster dose of polio vaccine

Nationality
 Djiboutien or Djiboutian

Ethnic groups
Afar 35%, Somali 60% and Arab 2%

Languages

The languages of Djibouti are:
French (official)
Arabic (official)
Somali
Afar

Education expenditures
3.6% of GDP (2018) Country comparison to the world: 116th

Literacy
definition: age 15 and over can read and write
total population: 67.9%
male: 60%
female: 58.4% (2003 est.)

School life expectancy (primary to tertiary education)
total: 7 years
male: 7 years
female: 7 years (2011)

total: 6 years (2011)
male: 7 years (2011)
female: 6 years (2011)

References

External links

 
Djibouti